Escapada is a 2018 comedy-drama film written and directed by Sarah Hirtt. It is an international coproduction between Belgium, Spain and Luxembourg featuring an ensemble cast of newcomers. The film had its world premiere at the 2018 Namur Film Festival.

At the 10th Magritte Awards, Escapada received three nominations in the categories of Best First Feature Film, Most Promising Actor for François Neycken and Most Promising Actress for Raphaëlle Corbisier.

Accolades

References

External links
 

2018 films
2018 comedy-drama films
Belgian comedy-drama films
Spanish comedy-drama films
Luxembourgian comedy-drama films
2010s French-language films
2010s Spanish-language films
French-language Belgian films
French-language Luxembourgian films